Khok Salung railway station is a railway station located in Khok Salung Subdistrict, Phatthana Nikhom District, Lopburi Province. From November until January of the following year, the Pa Sak Jolasid Dam excursion train runs across the Pa Sak Jolasid Reservoir viaduct and terminates at this station, using it as a switchback for the locomotive for the return trip to Bangkok.

References 

Railway stations in Thailand
Lopburi province